San Lorenzo di Valsanzibio is a Roman Catholic parish church in the frazione of Valsanzibio of the comune of Galzignano Terme, province of Padova, region of Veneto, Italy.

History
The first parish church in Valsanzibio was an ancient church dedicated to St Eusebius, former bishop of Vercelli. Since the pope fought Arian heresy, it is remarkable for a church of this name in former Lombard territory, a tribe known for Arianism. 

In the 17th-century, under venetian rule, the church was reconstructed. In 1687 under a procurator Barbarigo, the entire church was begun to be rebuilt in an opposite orientation. A neoclassic façade was added. The church in 2016 is deconsecrated and under restoration.

References

17th-century Roman Catholic church buildings in Italy
Churches in the province of Padova